The 2015–16 RB Leipzig season was the 7th season in club history and their 2nd season competing in the 2. Bundesliga.

Kits

Background

Events
On May 29, 2015, Ralf Rangnick was appointed to replace Achim Beierlorzer as the head coach. On June 9, 2015, it was confirmed they will play against Southampton F.C. on July 8, 2015.

Transfers

In

Out

Friendlies

2. Bundesliga

2. Bundesliga fixtures & results

League table

Results summary

DFB-Pokal

Squad statistics

|-
|colspan="10"|Players who left the club during the 2015–16 season
|-

|}

Notes

References

External links
 RB Leipzig website

RB Leipzig seasons
RB Leipzig